The 1844–45 United States Senate elections were held on various dates in various states, coinciding with James K. Polk's election. As these U.S. Senate elections were prior to the ratification of the Seventeenth Amendment in 1913, senators were chosen by state legislatures. Senators were elected over a wide range of time throughout 1844 and 1845, and a seat may have been filled months late or remained vacant due to legislative deadlock. In these elections, terms were up for the senators in Class 1.

The Democratic Party re-captured control of the Senate, gaining a net total of eleven seats from the Whigs.

Results summary 
Senate party division, 29th Congress (1845–1847)

 Majority party: Democratic (26–31)
 Minority party: Whig (24)
 Other parties: (0–1)
 Vacant: (4–2)
 Total seats: 54–58

Change in Senate composition

Before the elections

Result of the elections

Beginning of the next Congress

Beginning of the first session of the next Congress (December 1, 1845)

Race summaries

Special elections during the 28th Congress 
In these special elections, the winners were seated during 1844 or in 1845 before March 4; ordered by election date.

Races leading to the 29th Congress 
In these regular elections, the winners were elected for the term beginning March 4, 1845; ordered by state.

All of the elections involved the Class 1 seats.

Special elections during the 29th Congress 
In these special elections, the winners were elected in 1845 after March 4; ordered by election date.

Arkansas (special)

Connecticut

Delaware

Florida

Florida (regular)

Florida (special)

Georgia (special)

Indiana

Louisiana (special)

Maine

Maryland 

Reverdy Johnson won election by an unknown margin of votes, for the Class 1 seat.

Massachusetts

Massachusetts (regular)

Massachusetts (special)

Michigan

Mississippi

Missouri

New Jersey

New York 

There were three elections: Two special elections were held on January 18, 1845, and one regular election was held on February 4, 1845.

The 68th New York State Legislature met from January 7 to May 14, 1845.

New York (special, class 1) 
Nathaniel P. Tallmadge had been re-elected in 1840 to the Class 1 seat (term 1839-1845), but resigned June 17, 1844, to become Governor of Wisconsin Territory. On November 30, Governor of New York William C. Bouck appointed his Democratic Lieutenant Governor Daniel S. Dickinson to fill the vacancy temporarily, and Dickinson was seated December 9, 1844.

New York (special, class 3) 
Silas Wright Jr. had been re-elected in 1843 to the Class 3 seat (term 1843-1849), but resigned November 26, 1844, when elected Governor of New York. On November 30, Governor Bouck appointed Democratic State Senator Henry A. Foster to fill the vacancy temporarily, and Foster took his seat on December 9, 1844.

Dix took his seat on January 27, 1845, and remained in office until March 3, 1849, when his term expired.

New York (regular) 

Dickinson re-took his seat under the new credentials on January 27, 1845, and re-elected, remained in office until March 3, 1851, when his term expired.

Ohio

Pennsylvania

Pennsylvania (regular) 

The regular election was held January 14, 1845. Incumbent Daniel Sturgeon was re-elected by the Pennsylvania General Assembly to the United States Senate. The Pennsylvania General Assembly, consisting of the House of Representatives and the Senate, convened on January 14, 1845, to elect a Senator to serve the term beginning on March 4, 1845. The results of the vote of both houses combined are as follows:

|-
|-bgcolor="#EEEEEE"
| colspan="3" align="right" | Totals
| align="right" | 133
| align="right" | 100.00%
|}

Pennsylvania (special) 

A special election was held March 13, 1845. Simon Cameron was elected by the Pennsylvania General Assembly to the United States Senate. Democratic future-U.S. president James Buchanan was elected in an 1834 special election and was re-elected in 1836 and 1843.

Senator Buchanan resigned on March 5, 1845, after being appointed U.S. Secretary of State by President James K. Polk.

Following the resignation of senator Buchanan, the Pennsylvania General Assembly convened on March 13, 1845, to elect a new Ssenator to fill the vacancy and serve the remainder of the term set to expire on March 4, 1849. Five ballots were recorded. The results of the fifth and final ballot of both houses combined are as follows:

|-
|-bgcolor="#EEEEEE"
| colspan="3" align="right" | Totals
| align="right" | 133
| align="right" | 100.00%
|}

Rhode Island

Rhode Island (regular)

Rhode Island (special)

South Carolina (special)

Tennessee

Vermont

Virginia

Virginia (regular)

Virginia (special)

See also
 1844 United States elections
 1844 United States presidential election
 1844–45 United States House of Representatives elections
 29th United States Congress
 30th United States Congress

References

Sources and external links 
 Party Division in the Senate, 1789-Present, via Senate.gov
 Members of the 28th United States Congress, via GPOaccess.gov
 Members of the 29th United States Congress, via GPOaccess.gov
 Pennsylvania Election Statistics: 1682-2006 from the Wilkes University Election Statistics Project
 
 The New York Civil List compiled in 1858 (see: pg. 63 for U.S. Senators; pg. 134f for State Senators 1845; pg. 230f for Members of Assembly 1845)
  Political History of the State of New York, from Jan. 1, 1841, to Jan. 1, 1847; Vol. III by Jabez Delano Hammond (State election, 1844: pg. 505f; appointments, 1844: pg. 508f; Speaker election, 1845: pg. 518; U.S. Senate nominations, 1845: pg. 526ff) [gives wrong date for caucus, and election]
 Abridgment of the Debates in Congress, from 1789 to 1856: Dec. 4, 1843 to June 18, 1846 (page 197)
 Journal of the Senate (68th Session) (1845; pg. 77f and 142f)